Deloraine may refer to the following:
Deloraine, Tasmania, a town in Australia
Deloraine, Manitoba, a town in Canada
Earl of Deloraine, a title in the peerage of Scotland
 Deloraine a novel by William Godwin